Thomas More College is an independent Roman Catholic co-educational secondary day school, located in the northern  Adelaide suburb of Salisbury Downs, South Australia, Australia.

Overview 
Established in 1979, the college is named in honour of Saint Thomas More, an English lawyer, polemicist, politician and martyr. Its motto, “God’s Servant first”, is derived from the saint's last words before he was executed.

The college's catchment area is the northern Adelaide Parishes of Salisbury, Elizabeth North, Elizabeth South, Gawler, Virginia and Para Hills.

See also 

 List of schools in South Australia
 Catholic education in Australia

References

External links 
 Thomas More College

Catholic secondary schools in Adelaide
Educational institutions established in 1979
1979 establishments in Australia